is a former Japanese football player.

Club statistics

References

External links

1985 births
Living people
Association football people from Osaka Prefecture
Japanese footballers
J1 League players
J2 League players
Gamba Osaka players
Ehime FC players
Fagiano Okayama players
Association football forwards